Aníbal Médicis Candiota (14 June 1900 – 15 October 1949), known as just Candiota, was a Brazilian footballer. He played in three matches for the Brazil national football team in 1921. He was also part of Brazil's squad for the 1921 South American Championship.

References

External links
 

1900 births
1946 deaths
Brazilian footballers
Brazil international footballers
People from Bagé
Association football forwards
Cruzeiro Esporte Clube players
CR Flamengo footballers